The College of Law may refer to:

The College of Law (Australia), postgraduate school for the study of law
The former name of University of Law, a private university in the United Kingdom, providing law degrees